Lycurgus is a genus of cicadas in the family Cicadidae. There are at least three described species in Lycurgus.

Species
These three species belong to the genus Lycurgus:
 Lycurgus conspersus (Karsch, 1890) c g
 Lycurgus frontalis (Karsch, 1890) c g
 Lycurgus subvittus (Walker, F., 1850) c g
Data sources: i = ITIS, c = Catalogue of Life, g = GBIF, b = Bugguide.net

References

Further reading

 
 
 
 

Parnisini
Cicadidae genera